The Dudipatsar Trail is an approximately  hiking trail in the Lulusar-Dudipatsar National Park of Khyber-Pakhtunkhwa, in northern Pakistan. The trail goes along a tributary of the Kunhar River called Poorbi Narr in the northern Kaghan Valley. The average time taken to complete the trail is 5 to 8 hours.

Overview 

The trail is entirely within the national park and passes through multiple life zones of the park, from lowland forests to alpine meadows of wildflowers. As the trail climbs up to the plateau, hikers see different wildlife in the region including marmots and different species of birds.

The trail is of medium difficulty.  The overall elevation gain isn't great but climbing at high altitude makes the trail more demanding. During the course of the trail, one encounters boulders, meadows, plateaus, snow (in early summer) and streams.  The trail and the surrounding mountains are frequently used by cattle herders who set up summer homes in the area.

The main hiking season is mid-summer, which is often dry and sunny. Hikers early in the season can see snow in the ravine that runs down from the plateau. The plateau is marshy in places (waterproof boots advised). There are a number of river crossings on the trail including one buggy bridge. The same river tributary is crossed on log bridges on a couple of locations.

The trails starts at Besal, where there is a driver hotel and a police check post. Lodging is available as well as space for setting up camp. Parking of vehicles is done at one's own risk but someone can be hired to look after vehicles for a day or two.   

There are three ways to hike the trail:
 One-day trek (advised for moderate to experienced hikers) will not require a night stay. Going up to the lake can be done in about 3–5 hours while coming down it will take 3–4 hours.
 Two-day trek (for novice to moderate hikers) will require a night stay either in Mulla ki Basti ( short of Dudipatsar) or at Dudipat Lake itself. Going up to the lake can take anywhere from 6 to 10 hours.  Coming back is generally quicker, around 5–6 hours. Mules can be rented at Besal to carry luggage for the trek.
 A three-day trek will require two night stays in Mulla ki Basti or at Dudipatsar. Hikers can reach the planned destination and after an overnight stay have a full day to tour the lake. Again after a night stay they can get back easily.

Guides are available at Besal for hike to Dudipatsar.  Experienced hikers can wing it and go off on their own – remember to follow the water tributary as Dudipatsar is at the head.

Mid-September, most of the herding flocks and inhabitants of Mullah ki Basti come down in preparation of winter. The makeshift hotels are also shut down so no food is available. If one reaches Mullah ki Basti, abandoned stone houses are available to camp and rest for the night.

Camping
For the two day trek option, a night stay can be done either in Mulla ki Basti (2 km short of Dudipatsar) or at Dudipat Lake.  You have the option of either carrying along your camping gear or alternatively using the facilities at the makeshift hotel at Mulla ki Basti.  Price for food generally runs at twice of that at Besal.  (someone add lodging cost here for the makeshift hotel)

Chronology of images

See also
 Dudipatsar
 Lulusar-Dudipatsar National Park

Hiking trails in Pakistan